Alix Depauw, better known by the stage name Alix Perez, is a drum and bass DJ and producer, originally from Charleroi, Belgium. Based in New Zealand, his music is sometimes characterised as liquid funk amongst other labels, and released on labels such as Liquid V, Bassbin, Creative Source, Horizons, Progress, Brigand, Shogun Audio, Fokuz and Soul:R.

Biography
Starting to DJ at the age of 14 and producing at 17, Perez has collaborated with other artists such as Jenna G, Redeyes, Sabre and Specific, and his inspirations include artists such as Calibre, Marcus Intalex, Ill logic & DJ Raf, Artificial Intelligence and D Bridge.

Represented by Coda, he regularly played out in London and around Europe prior to his relocation to New Zealand in Autumn 2020. He describes his DJ style as, "eclectic. I play generally deep but dip into various aspects of drum & bass. I like to read the crowd and let the music breathe. I find mixing in the right musical keys essential. I basically see it as a journey."

Perez's tunes are played regularly on radio shows such as BBC 1Xtra and he has been doing many mixes for radio and podcast. He receives support from respected DJs and producers such as Bailey, Fabio and Bryan Gee. On one of his BBC shows, Fabio called the Perez song "Forsaken" the best drum and bass track of 2010.

Perez has been featured in popular drum and bass magazines and was on the cover of ATM Magazine in a feature on the "Leaders of the Nu Skool" in the drum and bass genre. He has had coverage in Knowledge Magazine, London-based dance music magazine One Week To Live, and regularly has his releases reviewed by DJ, Mixmag, Knowledge and ATM.

In 2009, Perez released his debut album, 1984, on drum and bass label Shogun Audio. The album features collaborations with Foreign Beggars, Lynx, Truth, Yungun and Spectrasoul among others.

In 2013, Perez released his second studio album, Chroma Chords, through Shogun Audio. It features collaborations with Two Inch Punch, Riko Dan, Foreign Beggars, Jehst, Phace & Misanthrop among others.

Since 2013, Perez has released multiple EPs, many in collaboration with other major artists such as Ivy Lab, Skeptical, Spectrasoul, and most notably Eprom, with whom he has released 4 EPs and an album since 2015 under the name Shades.

Perez also produces other veins of electronic music under the alias ARP 101.

Discography

Studio albums
 1984 (2009)
 Chroma Chords (2013)
 In Praise Of Darkness (with Eprom as Shades) (2018)
 From A Vein (with Eprom as Shades) (2022)

Extended plays and singles
Triple Soul - Dub Focus - Touchin Down production 003 (2005)
Alix Perez + Physics - Sound For The Masses - Fokuz 19 (2005)
Alix Perez + FX909 - Get It On - Strictly Digital (2005)
Triple Soul - Jazz Lick - Liquid V Club Sessions Vol 1 (2005)
Alix Perez- Sorrow - Shogun Audio (2006)
Alix Perez- All Alone - Spearhead Records (2006)
Alix Perez- Calypso - Horizons Music (2006)
Alix Perez feat. MC Fats - Down The Line - Shogun Audio (2006)
Alix Perez + Sabre - Recession - Progress (2006)
Alix Perez - Dubrock - Horizons Music 007 (2006)
Alix Perez + Specific - Love Bug - Horizons Music 007 (2006)
Alix Perez + Specific - Drive By - Progress (2006)
Alix Perez - Leave The Dread - Progress (2006)
Alix Perez + Specific - Just Memories - Horizons Music 012 (2006)
Alix Perez - Under My Skin - Horizons Music 012 (2006)
Alix Perez - Illusions - Lucky Devil Music (2006)
Alix Perez - Magnolias - Bassbin (2006)
Alix Perez - Backlash - Bassbin (2006)
Alix Perez + Specific - Side to Side - Brigand (2006)
Alix Perez + Sabre - Solitary Native - Shogun Ltd (2007)
Alix Perez + Redeyes - Watching You - Prestige Music (2007)
Alix Perez + Redeyes - Clone 1001 - Bingo Beats (2007)
Alix Perez + Youthman - Promise Land - Step Express Recordings (2007)
Alix Perez - Morning Sun - Creative Source (2007)
Alix Perez - Playing Tricks - Creative Source (2007)
Alix Perez - Allegiance EP - Soul:r (2008)
Alix Perez + Icicle + Switch - This Is How / Lovechat - SGN:LTD (2008)
Alix Perez - 1984 / Suffer in Silence - Shogun Audio (2009)
Alix Perez + Sabre - Everglade / God Fearing - Metalheadz (2009)
Alix Perez - I’m Free / Melanie - Shogun Audio	(2009)
Alix Perez + Survival - Storm Chaser - Audio Tactics (2009)
Alix Perez + Noisia + Stray + Joe Seven - Invisible 002 EP - Invisible Recordings (2010)
Alix Perez + Foreign Beggars + Noisia - Dark Days EP (2010) - Shogun Audio
Phace, Alix Perez & Rockwell - Stresstest / Ballbag (2012) - Neosignal
 U (2014) - Exit Records
 Surplus One EP (2015) - Free Download
 Recall and Reflect EP (2015) - Exit Records
 Shades EP (with Eprom) (2015) - Alpha Pup Records
D-Bridge Vs Skeptical / D-Bridge Vs. Alix Perez - No Discipline / Through My Eyes (2016) - Exit Records
Alix Perez & Ivy Lab - Arkestra EP (2016) - Critical Recordings
Alix Perez + Zero T - The Ladders / Enemy of Reason (2016) - Dispatch Recordings
Alix Perez & Eprom Presents Shades - Powers Of Two (2016)
Alix Perez - Elephant Dreams EP (2016) - 1985 Music
Alix Perez - Numbers EP (2016) - 1985 Music
Skeptical & Alix Perez - Without A Trace EP (2017) - Exit Records
Alix Perez & SpectraSoul - Synergy EP (2017) - 1985 Music
Alix Perez - Nighthawks EP (2017) - 1985 Music
Alix Perez - Enchiridion EP (2018) - 1985 Music
Alix Perez - Last Rites EP (2019) - 1985 Music
Alix Perez - Phantonym EP (2019) - 1985 Music
Alix Perez - Ravana EP (2020) - 1985 Music
Alix Perez - Without End EP (2020) - 1985 Music
Alix Perez - Wairua EP'' (2022) - 1985 Music

References

External links
Alix Perez on Myspace
The End Interview
Alix Perez's discography

Short interview on Drum & Bass Arena about one of his biggest tunes to date

Drum and bass musicians
Belgian DJs
Living people
Electronic dance music DJs
Year of birth missing (living people)